The following is a list of events in the year 2022 in Chile.

Incumbents
 President: 
Sebastián Piñera (RN, until 11 March)
Gabriel Boric (CS, from 11 March)

Events
Ongoing — COVID-19 pandemic in Chile

January 
 1-15 January - 2022 Hunga Tonga–Hunga Ha'apai eruption and tsunami

February 
 1 February - Chile beats Bolivia 3-2 at a football match in La Paz, eliminating the latter from participating in the final tournament of the FIFA World Cup.

March 
2 March – Chile voted on a United Nations resolution condemning Russia for its invasion of Ukraine.

September 
 A proposed new constitution is rejected by 61% of voters.

Sport

Football 

 2022 Chilean Primera División
 2022 Primera B de Chile
 2022 Copa Chile

Other sports 

 8 May: Santiago Marathon
 Chile at the 2022 Winter Olympics
 Chile at the 2022 Winter Paralympics

Deaths

January 
 7 January – Luis Pareto González, 93, politician (b. 1928)
 13 January – Arturo Frei Bolívar, 82, politician (b. 1939)
 21 January – Leonor Oyarzún, 102, family therapist, first lady (1990–1994) (b. 1919)

February 

 4 February – Sergio Bravo, 72, screenwriter (b. 1949)
 10 February – Mane Nett, 73, actress and cultural manager (b. 1948)
 12 February – Tomás Osvaldo González Morales, 76, Roman Catholic bishop (b. 1935)
 16 February – Cristina Calderón, 93, Yaghan singer, ethnographer, and writer (b. 1928)

March 
 5 March – Patricio Renán, 77, singer (b. 1945)
 7 March 
Héctor Vargas Bastidas, 70, Chilean Roman Catholic prelate (b. 1951)
Benjamín Prado Casas, 96, politician (b. 1926)
 20 March – Adriana Hoffmann, 82, botanist, environmentalist and author (b. 1940)
 31 March – Patricia Poblete, 75, economist, Minister of Housing and Urbanism (2006–2010) (b. 1946)

April 
2 April – Leonel Sánchez, 85, footballer (Universidad de Chile, Colo-Colo, national team) and manager (b. 1936)
17 April – Mireya Baltra, 90, journalist and politician, deputy (1969–1973) and minister of labor (1972).

References 

 
Chile
Chile
2020s in Chile
Years of the 21st century in Chile